This is a list of Waffen-SS division commanders.

1st SS Division Leibstandarte SS Adolf Hitler
SS-Commanders

2nd SS Panzer Division Das Reich
SS-Commanders

3rd SS Division Totenkopf
SS-Commanders

4th SS Polizei Division
SS-Commanders

5th SS Panzer Division Wiking
SS-Commanders

6th SS Mountain Division Nord
SS-Commanders

7th SS Volunteer Mountain Division Prinz Eugen
SS-Commanders

8th SS Cavalry Division Florian Geyer
SS-Commanders

9th SS Panzer Division Hohenstaufen
SS-Commanders

10th SS Panzer Division Frundsberg
SS-Commanders

11th SS Volunteer Panzergrenadier Division Nordland
SS-Commanders

12th SS Panzer Division Hitlerjugend
SS-Commanders

13th Waffen Mountain Division of the SS Handschar (1st Croatian)
SS-Commanders

14th Waffen Grenadier Division of the SS Galicia (1st Ukrainian)
SS-Commanders

15th Waffen Grenadier Division of the SS (1st Latvian)
SS-Commanders

16th SS Panzergrenadier Division Reichsführer-SS
SS-Commanders

17th SS Panzergrenadier Division Götz von Berlichingen
SS-Commanders

18th SS Volunteer Panzer Grenadier Division Horst Wessel
SS-Commanders

19th Waffen Grenadier Division of the SS (2nd Latvian)
SS-Commanders

20th Waffen Grenadier Division of the SS (1st Estonian)
SS-Commanders

21st Waffen Mountain Division of the SS Skanderbeg (1st Albanian)
SS-Commanders

22nd SS Volunteer Cavalry Division Maria Theresia
SS-Commanders

23rd Waffen Mountain Division of the SS Kama
SS-Commanders

23rd SS Volunteer Panzer Grenadier Division Nederland
SS-Commanders

24th Waffen Mountain Division of the SS Karstjäger
SS-Commanders

25th Waffen Grenadier Division of the SS Hunyadi (1st Hungarian)
SS-Commanders

26th Waffen Grenadier Division of the SS (2nd Hungarian)
SS-Commanders

27th SS Volunteer Division Langemarck
SS-Commanders

28th SS Volunteer Grenadier Division Wallonien
SS-Commanders

29th Waffen Grenadier Division of the SS RONA (1st Russian)
SS-Commanders

29th Waffen Grenadier Division of the SS (1st Italian)
SS-Commanders

30th Waffen Grenadier Division of the SS (2nd Russian)
SS-Commanders

30th Waffen Grenadier Division of the SS (1st Belarussian)
SS-Commanders

31st SS Volunteer Grenadier Division Batschka
SS-Commanders

32nd SS Volunteer Grenadier Division 30 January
SS-Commanders

33rd Waffen Cavalry Division of the SS (3rd Hungarian)
SS-Commanders

33rd Waffen Grenadier Division of the SS Charlemagne (1st French)
SS-Commanders

34th SS Volunteer Grenadier Division Landstorm Nederland
SS-Commanders

35th SS and Police Grenadier Division
SS-Commanders

36th Waffen Grenadier Division of the SS
SS-Commanders

37th SS Volunteer Cavalry Division Lützow
SS-Commanders

38th SS Division Nibelungen
SS-Commanders

References

 Waffen-SS Commanders by Mark C. Yerger
 Waffen-SS Divisions 1939-45 by Chris Bishop

Division commanders